East Field is a stadium in Glens Falls, New York, United States that opened in 1980.  It is currently used for sporting events, mostly baseball and football. The complex is the former home of the Adirondack Lumberjacks, the Glens Falls White Sox/Glens Falls Tigers (an affiliate of the Chicago White Sox and Detroit Tigers), the Glens Falls Redbirds, and the Glens Falls Golden Eagles (Perfect Game Collegiate Baseball League). 

Currently, East Field is the home of the Glens Falls Dragons, a collegiate summer league baseball team competing in the Perfect Game Collegiate Baseball League.  The Dragons began in 2015, when a change in team ownership and front office replaced the former Glens Falls Golden Eagles.  Also, the Glens Falls Greenjackets American football team of the Empire Football League currently compete at the stadium.  The Greenjackets were founded in 1928, and are currently the second oldest semi-professional football team in the country, have played at East Field since 1980.

In addition to hosting the home game events for the Dragons and Greenjackets, East Field also currently hosts the USCAA College World Series and the NJCAA (National Junior College Athletic Association) baseball World Series.  Beginning in 1981, A DCI sanctioned Drum & Bugle Corps event called "Adirondack Drums" and was organized by the Fort Edward Lions Club performed annually until 2012.  In 2018 the DCI sanctioned drum and bugle corps show was reborn as a fundraiser for the non-profit group "Friends of East Field" by Chris Reed, Jr. of the Glens Falls Music Academy.  The new/rebirthed event is known as the "Glens Falls Music Academy Showcase".

The ballpark has a capacity for 6,000 sport fans to enjoy action from all corners of the complex.

East Field is located at 175 Dix Avenue in Glens Falls, NY, on the eastern edge of the city.

Sports venues in New York (state)
Minor league baseball venues
Baseball venues in New York (state)
Sports venues in Warren County, New York
American football venues in New York (state)
1980 establishments in New York (state)
Sports venues completed in 1980